Heid is both a surname and a given name. Notable people with the name include:

Bill Heid (born 1948), American jazz musician
Chris Heid (born 1983), Canadian-German ice hockey player
Jack Heid (1924–1987), American cyclist
Heid E. Erdrich (born 1963), Native American writer
Rik Heid, American para-alpine skier